The tyrolienne is a Tyrolean folk dance. Additionally, it is the French word for "ziplining."

Notes

Dance forms in classical music
Austrian folk dances